No One Stands Alone may refer to:

 No One Stands Alone (Blue Murder album), 2002
 No One Stands Alone (Don Gibson album), 1958